Mitchell James Larkin (born 9 July 1993) is an Australian competitive swimmer who specialises in backstroke events. He currently represents the Cali Condors which is part of the International Swimming League. Larkin competed for Australia at the 2012 Summer Olympics, 2016 Summer Olympics and the 2020 Summer Olympics.

Career

2014
Larkin won a gold medal in the 200 meter backstroke and a silver medal in both the 50 meter and 100 meter backstroke at the 2014 Commonwealth Games in Glasgow, Scotland.

2015
He won two gold in the 100 meter and 200 meter backstroke at the 2015 World Aquatics Championships in Kazan, Russia.

His personal best in long course events are 52.11 for the 100 meter backstroke and 1:53.17 for the 200 meter backstroke, both set at the Dubai world cup in November 2015.

In November 2015, Larkin broke the short course world record in the 200 meter backstroke, lowering it to 1:45.63.

2016
At the 2016 Summer Olympics swimming championships, Larkin represented Australia in the 100 metre and 200 metre backstroke and the 4 x 100 meter medley relay. In the 100 metre backstroke, Larkin was the third fastest in the heats with a time of 53.04 and third fastest out of the two second semi-final heats with a time of 52.70.

Despite only being three hundredths slower than his gold medal-winning time at the 2015 world championships, he missed out on a medal, finishing fourth in the final with a time of 52.43.

Larkin set a record as the first swimmer to win every backstroke event and also the most gold medals for a swimmer at a single Commonwealth Games event. Five gold medals included 50 meter, 100 meter and 200 meter backstroke, as well as the 200 meter Individual Medley and 4 x 100 meter Medley.

International Swimming League
In 2019 he was a member of the inaugural International Swimming League representing the Cali Condors, who finished third place in the final match in Las Vegas, Nevada in December. Larkin was one of the top point scorers at each match for the Condors swimming backstroke, IM, and relays.

World records

Short course metres

See also
List of Commonwealth Games medallists in swimming (men)
World record progression 200 metres backstroke

References

External links
  (archive)
 
 
 
 
 

1993 births
Living people
People from Nambour, Queensland
Australian male medley swimmers
Australian male backstroke swimmers
Olympic swimmers of Australia
Swimmers at the 2012 Summer Olympics
Swimmers at the 2016 Summer Olympics
Swimmers at the 2020 Summer Olympics
Medalists at the 2016 Summer Olympics
Olympic silver medalists for Australia
Olympic bronze medalists for Australia
Olympic silver medalists in swimming
Olympic bronze medalists in swimming
Swimmers at the 2014 Commonwealth Games
Swimmers at the 2018 Commonwealth Games
Swimmers at the 2022 Commonwealth Games
Commonwealth Games medallists in swimming
Commonwealth Games gold medallists for Australia
Commonwealth Games silver medallists for Australia
World Aquatics Championships medalists in swimming
Medalists at the FINA World Swimming Championships (25 m)
World record holders in swimming
People educated at John Paul College (Brisbane)
20th-century Australian people
21st-century Australian people
Sportsmen from Queensland
Medallists at the 2014 Commonwealth Games
Medallists at the 2018 Commonwealth Games
Medallists at the 2022 Commonwealth Games